Povero Cristo is 1976 Italian film written and directed by Pier Carpi.

Plot
A young man with aspirations of becoming a private investigator is approached by a stranger who promises 100 million lire if he obtains evidence of the existence of Jesus Christ.

References

External links

1976 films
Italian fantasy films
1970s Italian-language films
1970s Italian films